Lautaro René Coronel (15 January 1997 – 3 June 2022) known as El Noba, was an  Argentine singer of cumbia. In 2021, he rose to fame after releasing "Tamo chelo", making his debut on the Billboard Argentina Hot 100 list.

Biography 
Coronel was born on 15 January 1997 in Florencio Varela. In his adolescence he worked as a bricklayer, like his father. He also worked as a food delivery man, but due to improper use in the quarantine of the COVID-19 pandemic, the Police of Buenos Aires confiscated his motorcycle with which he worked. It was then that he began to venture into Instagram, where his followers sent him questions asking for advice for him to answer.

Career 
In 2021 Coronel released his first song, "Tamo chelo", with which he quickly rose to fame, being all the rage on social networks and even debuting on the Argentina Hot 100 list of Billboard.

In December of that same year he also collaborated with Perro Primo and R Jota on the single "Yendo no, llegando", which became a hit with more than 38 million views on YouTube. In 2022 he would release several songs in collaboration, including "Pica" with La Joaqui, "Salimo en caravana" with The La Planta and Locura Mix, "Turra (Remix)" with the R. Jota and PapiChamp, among others. The last song released by the artist was on 30 March of that same year, entitled "Allá" with R. Jota and DJ Plaga.

Death 
On 24 May 2022, Coronel was driving his motorcycle at a high rate of speed in Florencio Varela. At an intersection, his motorcycle collided with a Peugeot 308, and he fell, hitting his head on the pavement. He was admitted to El Cruce Hospital, where, on 3 June 2022, his death was reported.

Discography

Singles

References

External links 
 
 
 El Noba en YouTube

1997 births
2022 deaths
21st-century Argentine male singers
People from Florencio Varela Partido
Road incident deaths in Argentina
Motorcycle road incident deaths